Charles Bent (November 11, 1799 – January 19, 1847) was an American businessman and politician who served as the first civilian United States governor of the New Mexico Territory, newly acquired by the Military Governor, Stephen Watts Kearny, in September 1846.

Bent had been working as a fur trader in the region since 1828, with his younger brother, William, and later partner Ceran St. Vrain. Though his office was in Santa Fe, Bent maintained his residence and a trading post in Taos, New Mexico Territory, in present-day New Mexico. On January 19, 1847, Bent was scalped and killed by Pueblo warriors, during the Taos Revolt.

Early life
Charles Louis Bent was born in Charleston, Virginia, the oldest child of Judge Silas Bent, and his wife Martha Kerr.

Career

U.S. Army and Bent & St. Vrain Company
After leaving the army, in 1828, Charles and his younger brother, William, took a wagon train of goods from St. Louis to Santa Fe. There they established mercantile contacts and began a series of trading trips back and forth over the Santa Fe Trail. In 1832, he formed a partnership with Ceran St. Vrain, another trader from St. Louis, called Bent & St. Vrain Company. In addition to its store in Taos, New Mexico, the trading company established a series of "forts", fortified trading posts, to facilitate trade with the Plains Indians, including Fort Saint Vrain on the South Platte River and Bent's Fort on the Arkansas River, both in Colorado, and Fort Adobe on the Canadian River. Bent's Fort, outside La Junta, Colorado, has been restored and is now a National Historic Site.

Territorial Governor
Following the bloodless occupation of New Mexico, many of the inhabitants of New Mexico were not happy about the new American rule. Some mourned the loss of the old connection with Mexico, others feared the loss of their private goods, and others hated Bent, the New Mexican Territorial Governor who served under the U.S. war-time occupation, because of his negative attitude towards Mexicans. In December 1846, the influential families in the state started to plan a revolt against their new rulers. The governor and Colonel Price found out about the conspiracy and some of the leaders of the movement were arrested, but two important ones were able to escape.

Death
In January 1847, while serving as territorial governor, Bent traveled to his hometown of Taos without military protection. After arriving, he was scalped alive and murdered in his home by a group of pueblo Native American attackers, under the orders of Mexican conspirators who started the Taos Revolt. Bent is buried in the National Cemetery in Santa Fe.

The women and children in the Bent home were not harmed by the insurgents, and the remaining members of the family fled to safety next door through a hole in the parlor wall.

In the following months, Colonel Price was able to quell the uprising, which ended in July 1847. Most of the rebels were caught and some of them were executed.

Personal life
In 1835, Charles "Carlos" Bent married Maria Ignacia Jaramillo, who was born in Taos, New Mexico. Maria's younger sister, Josefa Jaramillo, would later marry Kit Carson.

Legacy
Bent and the renowned frontier scout Christopher "Kit" Carson married sisters. Maria Ignacia Bent outlived her husband by 36 years and died on April 13, 1883. The Bents had two daughters, Teresina and Estefana (Estefania) and a son, Alfred. Maria Bent and the Carsons are interred at Kit Carson Cemetery in Taos.

Bent Street, which runs in front of what had been his home in Taos, and Martyr's Lane, which runs behind it, are named for him.

The Governor Charles Bent House is now a museum. An elementary school in northeast Albuquerque is named in Bent's honor.

Works
Bent documented the indigenous peoples of New Mexico in an essay which was published posthumously in Henry Schoolcraft's study of American Indians:

See also
 List of assassinated American politicians

Notes

References
 
 
 
 
 

1799 births
1847 deaths
1847 murders in the United States
19th-century American politicians
American expatriates in Mexico
American people of the Mexican–American War
Assassinated American politicians
Burials at Santa Fe National Cemetery
Businesspeople from West Virginia
Governors of New Mexico Territory
People from Taos, New Mexico
People of pre-statehood West Virginia
People of the Taos Revolt
Politicians from Charleston, West Virginia
United States Military Academy alumni
People murdered in New Mexico
Assassinated American governors